The 1997 Lehigh Mountain Hawks football team was an American football team that represented Lehigh University during the 1997 NCAA Division I-AA football season. Lehigh tied for second-to-last in the Patriot League.

In their fourth year under head coach Kevin Higgins, the Mountain Hawks compiled a 4–7 record. Rabih Abdullah, Caleb Moyer and Nate Kmieciak were the team captains.

The Mountain Hawks were outscored 326 to 307. Lehigh's 2–4 conference record placed it in a three-way tie for fourth in the seven-team Patriot League standings. 

Lehigh played its home games at Goodman Stadium on the university's Goodman Campus in Bethlehem, Pennsylvania.

Schedule

References

Lehigh
Lehigh Mountain Hawks football seasons
Lehigh Engineers football